Paddy the Next Best Thing is a 1923 British silent romance film directed by Graham Cutts and starring Mae Marsh, Darby Foster and Lilian Douglas. It was based on the 1908 novel of the same title by Gertrude Page and a 1920 stage adaptation, which was later adapted into a 1933 American film. It was made at the Gainsborough Studios in Islington. American star Mae Marsh had been brought over from Hollywood to star in the company's previous film Flames of Passion and stayed on to make this film.

It is believed to be a lost film.

Cast

See also
List of lost films

References

Bibliography
 Low, Rachael. History of the British Film, 1918-1929. George Allen & Unwin, 1971.

External links
 
 Paddy the Next Best Thing at SilentEra
 Paddy the Next Best Thing at Jazz Age Club

1923 films
1920s romance films
British romance films
Films directed by Graham Cutts
British silent feature films
Films based on British novels
British films based on plays
Films set in Ireland
Films set in London
Islington Studios films
Lost British films
Films based on adaptations
British black-and-white films
1923 lost films
Lost romance films
1920s English-language films
1920s British films
English-language romance films